Maurice Jacques Thédié (29 January 1896 – 2 July 1944) was a French footballer who played for Red Star Amical Club and AC Amiens. He was part of the France national team, playing one match in 1925. A member of the French Resistance during the Second World War, Thédié was arrested and died on a train bound for Dachau concentration camp on 2 July 1944.

References

External links
 

1896 births
1944 deaths
French footballers
France international footballers
Footballers from Hauts-de-Seine
Red Star F.C. players
AC Amiens players
French Resistance members
Resistance members who died in Nazi concentration camps
French people who died in Dachau concentration camp
French civilians killed in World War II
Association footballers not categorized by position